Blythe is a city in Richmond County in the U.S. state of Georgia. As of the 2020 census, the city had a population of 744.  It is part of the Augusta, Georgia metropolitan area.

Geography
Blythe is located at  (33.294858, -82.200623).

Demographics

2020 census

As of the 2020 United States census, there were 744 people, 224 households, and 160 families residing in the city.

2010 census
As of the 2010 United States Census, there were 721 people living in the city. The racial makeup of the city was 78.6% White, 14.0% Black, 0.4% Native American, 0.6% Asian, 0.1% from some other race and 1.9% from two or more races. 4.3% were Hispanic or Latino of any race.

2000 census
As of the census of 2000, there were 718 people, 240 households, and 185 families living in the city. The racial makeup of the city was 81.62% White, 14.21% African American, 0.28% Native American, 0.70% Pacific Islander, 0.42% from other races, and 2.79% from two or more races. Hispanic or Latino of any race were 3.20% of the population.

There were 240 households, out of which 46.7% had children under the age of 18 living with them, 54.2% were married couples living together, 17.9% had a female householder with no husband present, and 22.9% were non-families. 18.8% of all households were made up of individuals, and 3.3% had someone living alone who was 65 years of age or older.  The average household size was 2.91 and the average family size was 3.30.

In the city, the population was spread out, with 34.0% under the age of 18, 6.4% from 18 to 24, 30.2% from 25 to 44, 21.4% from 45 to 64, and 7.9% who were 65 years of age or older.  The median age was 31 years. For every 100 females, there were 102.8 males.  For every 100 females age 18 and over, there were 103.4 males.

The median income for a household in the city was $36,705, and the median income for a family was $40,000. Males had a median income of $28,393 versus $22,039 for females. The per capita income for the city was $15,190.  About 10.2% of families and 16.4% of the population were below the poverty line, including 19.1% of those under age 18 and 9.5% of those age 65 or over.

See also

Central Savannah River Area

References

External links
Blythe Elementary School

Cities in Georgia (U.S. state)
Cities in Burke County, Georgia
Cities in Richmond County, Georgia
Augusta metropolitan area